Dejan Jurkič (born 9 December 1983 in Kranj) is a Slovenian footballer who last played for NK Maribor.

Notes

External links

Profile at Prvaliga.si

1984 births
Living people
Sportspeople from Kranj
Slovenian footballers
Association football defenders
Örgryte IS players
Panserraikos F.C. players
Slovenian PrvaLiga players
Allsvenskan players
Czech First League players
SK Sigma Olomouc players
SK Kladno players
1. FC Slovácko players
NK Maribor players
Slovenian expatriate footballers
Slovenian expatriate sportspeople in the Czech Republic
Slovenian expatriate sportspeople in Greece
Slovenian expatriate sportspeople in Sweden
Expatriate footballers in the Czech Republic
Expatriate footballers in Greece
Expatriate footballers in Sweden